The Naegele springsnail, also known as the Presidio County springsnail, scientific name Pyrgulopsis metcalfi, is a species of very small or minute freshwater snail with an operculum, an aquatic gastropod mollusk in the family Hydrobiidae.

This species is endemic to the United States.  Its natural habitat is springs. It is threatened by habitat loss.

References

Molluscs of the United States
Pyrgulopsis
Gastropods described in 1987
Taxonomy articles created by Polbot